Franklin Tot Farrel III (March 23, 1908 – July 2, 2003) was an American ice hockey player who competed in the 1932 Winter Olympics.

He was born and died in New Haven, Connecticut.

In 1932 he was a member of the American ice hockey team, which won the silver medal. He played all six matches as goaltender.

External links

profile 

1908 births
2003 deaths
American men's ice hockey goaltenders
Ice hockey people from New Haven, Connecticut
Ice hockey players at the 1932 Winter Olympics
Medalists at the 1932 Winter Olympics
Olympic silver medalists for the United States in ice hockey
Yale Bulldogs men's ice hockey players